Catherine Ivy Anton (born 1965) married name Catherine Popple is a former English international lawn bowler.

Bowls career
Anton represented England in the fours event, at the 1994 Commonwealth Games in Victoria, British Columbia, Canada.

In 1998 she represented England at the 1998 Commonwealth Games in Kuala Lumpur and won a bronze medal in the fours event with Norma Shaw, Mandy Jacklin and Shirley Page.

In 1999 she won the fours silver medal at the Atlantic Bowls Championships.

Anton is also an eleven times national champion representing Huntingdonshire, one singles, one pairs, one triples, four fours and four junior.

She married fellow bowler Stuart Popple.

References

Living people
1965 births
Commonwealth Games medallists in lawn bowls
Commonwealth Games bronze medallists for England
English female bowls players
Bowls players at the 1994 Commonwealth Games
Bowls players at the 1998 Commonwealth Games
Bowls European Champions
Medallists at the 1998 Commonwealth Games